Okanagan Lake is a lake in the Okanagan Valley of British Columbia, Canada.

Hydrography 
Okanagan Lake is called a fjord lake as it has been carved out by repeated glaciations.
Major inflows include Mission, Vernon, Trout, Penticton, Equesis, Kelowna, Peachland and Powers Creeks. 
The lake is drained by the Okanagan River, which exits the lake's south end via a canal through the city of Penticton to Skaha Lake, whence the river continues southwards into the rest of the South Okanagan and through Okanogan County, Washington to its confluence with the Columbia.

The lake's maximum depth is  near Grant Island (Nahun Weenox). There are three other islands: one known as Rattlesnake Island, much farther south by Squally Point. The other two are near Grant Island. They are unnamed and are located just north of the north-point of Whisky Cove at Carrs Landing.

Notable features of the Okanagan Valley include terraces which were formed due to the periodic lowering of the lake's predecessor, glacial Lake Penticton. These terraces are now used extensively for agriculture such as fruit cultivation.

Geographical context 
Cities bordering the lake include Vernon in the north, Penticton in the south, and Kelowna, as well as the municipalities of Lake Country (north of Kelowna), West Kelowna (west of Kelowna), Peachland (south of West Kelowna), and Summerland (north-west of Penticton). Unincorporated communities include Naramata (north-east of Penticton).

Various lake features include Rattlesnake Island (a small island east of Peachland), Squally Point (a popular cliff-diving area) & Fintry Delta on the west side.

The five-lane William R. Bennett Bridge, a floating bridge with a high boat passage arch connects Kelowna to the city of West Kelowna and the community of Westbank. This bridge replaced the three-lane floating Okanagan Lake Bridge on May 30, 2008, which had a lift span for passage of large boats.

Steamboats of Lake Okanagan

During the early days of settlement and development of the Okanagan region, the lack of roads in the region made the lake a natural corridor for passenger travel and freight.  The Canadian Pacific Railway Lake and River Service was the main carrier on the lakes, providing freight and passenger connections between Penticton, on the Kettle Valley Railway (the Southern Mainline) and Okanagan Landing (Vernon) for connections to the CPR Mainline at Sicamous via the Shuswap and Okanagan Railway.  Smaller vessels such as the SS Naramata provided passenger service to smaller settlements around the lake, as well as excursions for tourists.

Vessels
 (freight)
 (luxury-class passenger service)
 (luxury-class passenger service)
 (luxury-class passenger service)
 (sternwheeler)
SS Naramata (excursion and water-taxi)
 (Fintry Queen, excursion and water-taxi)
 - 1950-1960 (Bowen Queen 1960-1965, MV Vesuvius Queen 1965-1998)
 (steel ferry)
 (steam tug)
 (steam tug)
 (ferry)
 (ferry)
 (1919 ferry)
 (1923 ferry)
Canadian National Tug no. 6 (diesel tug)
Canadian National Tug no. 5 (tug)
MV Kelowna-Westbank (ferry)
 (1912 ferry)
 (1906 ferry)
 (ferry)
 (ferry)
Colleen (rowboat)
 (ferry)
 (ferry)
 (ferry)
 (tug)
 (early steamship)
Ruth Shorts (rowboat)
 (early steamship)
 (early steamship)

Landings
Penticton
Naramata
Peachland
Summerland
Okanagan Mission
Kelowna
Okanagan Landing (Vernon)
Fintry
Carr's Landing
Ewing (Ewing's Landing)
Killiney Beach

Recreation 
Many parks and beaches are found along the shores of the lake, which make boating and swimming very popular activities.

The lake is home to several species of fish, including rainbow trout and kokanee. It is said by some to be home to its own lake monster – a giant serpent-like creature named Ogopogo.

Images

See also
 Okanagan Falls
 Okanagan people
 Okanagan Trail
 List of tributaries of the Columbia River
 Skaha Lake

References

External links
Bacon Magazine: The Ogo Pogo
Okanagan Lake History website
Gallery of Okanagan Lake steamboats

 Okanagan Lake
Lakes of the Okanagan
Articles containing video clips
Osoyoos Division Yale Land District